The Swine Flu is a mixtape by rapper Tony Yayo hosted by G-Unit's DJ Whoo Kid and Zoe Pound's Makazo. The  mixtape features exclusive tracks from Tony Yayo with appearances by 50 Cent, Lil Boosie and more. It was released for digital download on May 26, 2009 on datpiff.  There are several diss tracks taking aim at former correctional officer turned rapper, Rick Ross.

Background
The song "Ok, You're Right" was released as a promotional single for 50 Cent's album, Before I Self Destruct.

Track list

References

2009 mixtape albums
Tony Yayo albums